Union Glacier Blue-Ice Runway  is the blue ice runway for Union Glacier Camp in Antarctica. It is located in the Heritage Range, Ellsworth Mountains, on the glacier that gives it its name. It is operated by Antarctic Logistics & Expeditions LLC (ALE), a company that provides expedition support and tours to the interior of Antarctica.

The runway was certified by the Chilean Directorate General of Civil Aviation in December 2008.

See also
 List of airports in Antarctica

References

Airports in Ellsworth Land
Airports in Antarctica